Shivagnanam, known by the stage name P. Madhuri, is a South Indian playback singer. She has sung songs in Malayalam, Tamil, and Telugu. She has twice won Kerala State Film Award for best playback singer.

Early life
Shivagnanam was born in Tiruchirappalli in a Tamil family on 3 November 1941. She married V. Jayaram at the age of 13 and became the mother of two kids by 16. She was a part of an amateur drama troupe when Malayalam music director G. Devarajan happened to watch one of her performances at Madras. She was introduced to films by Devarajan through Kadalppalam (1969), in which she sang the famous Mappila song "Kasthuri Thailamittu Mudi Minukki". Devarajan handpicked her and groomed her into one of the most successful Malayalam playback singers of all time.

Career
She mainly sings Malayalam songs. She was probably the fourth most prominent female singer after S. Janaki, P. Susheela and P Leela in Malayalam in the 1970s and mainly sang songs composed by G. Devarajan Master. She has sung a total of 552 songs in Malayalam out of which majority is under G. Devarajan. This is a record in Malayalam film industry which no other female signers can claim. She has several folk songs, comedy songs, classical songs, devotional songs, romantic songs, sad songs under her credit, but what made her more popular was her ability to sing in high pitches. She had sung for all the music directors of that time, except MS Baburaj.

References

Indian women playback singers
Musicians from Tiruchirappalli
20th-century Indian singers
Malayalam playback singers
Kerala State Film Award winners
Living people
1943 births
20th-century Indian women singers
Singers from Tamil Nadu
Women musicians from Tamil Nadu
21st-century Indian women singers
21st-century Indian singers